The discography of Asleep at the Wheel (AATW), an American country band, consists of 26 studio albums (including collaborations and tribute albums), 16 live albums, 21 compilation albums, seven extended plays (EPs), 40 singles, four video albums and 19 music videos.

Formed in 1970, AATW released its debut album Comin' Right at Ya on United Artists Records in 1973, followed by a self-titled second album the following year on Epic. After signing with Capitol in 1975, the band issued its first charting album Texas Gold, which reached number 136 on the US Billboard 200 and number 7 on the Top Country Albums chart. Lead single "The Letter That Johnny Walker Read" reached the Hot Country Songs top ten. The following three releases, Wheelin' and Dealin' (1976), The Wheel (1977) and Collision Course (1978) all reached the top 50 of the Country Albums chart, and the first two registered on the Billboard 200. After issuing its first live album Served Live in 1979, the group signed with MCA Records and released Framed, which reached number 191 on the Billboard 200.

Between 1981 and 1985, AATW worked without a record label, before issuing Pasture Prime on Demon and Stony Plain Records. The band signed with Epic again and released 10 and Western Standard Time in 1987 and 1988, both of which reached the Billboard Top Country Albums chart top 40. "House of Blue Lights", the lead single from 10, was the band's second to reach the Hot Country Singles top ten, peaking at number 17. After two albums on Arista, the group released Tribute to the Music of Bob Wills and the Texas Playboys in 1993, which reached number 159 on the Billboard 200 and number 35 on the country chart. 1995's The Wheel Keeps on Rollin' reached number 3 on the Canadian country chart. 1997's Merry Texas Christmas, Y'all reached number 75 on the US country chart.

AATW reached number 24 on the Billboard Country Albums chart with Ride with Bob, a second Bob Wills tribute, in 1999. For the next ten years, the band released albums on various independent record labels, none of which registered on the charts. They returned to the charts in 2009 with Willie and the Wheel, a collaboration with Willie Nelson, which was the band's first release to reach the top 100 of the Billboard 200. The next year, the band collaborated with Leon Rausch on It's a Good Day, which reached number 57 on the Billboard Top Country Albums chart. A third tribute album, Still the King, reached number 11 on the US country chart in 2015.

Albums

Studio albums

Live albums

Compilations

Extended plays

Singles

Other charted songs

Videos

Video albums

Music videos

Footnotes

References

External links
Asleep at the Wheel official website

Asleep at the Wheel
Asleep at the Wheel